Delmita is a census-designated place in Starr County, Texas, United States. Its elevation is 272 feet (83 m).  Although Delmita is unincorporated, it has a post office, with the ZIP code of 78536. This CDP was new for the 2010 census with a population of 216.

It was founded as Zaragosa in 1919. The community's name was changed to Delmita on April 1, 1931 because of confusion with the Reeves County community of Saragosa. The community's first post office was established soon after the community, and a new post office was constructed in 1991. Delmita's importance has declined through the years; in 1940, it was the most important community in the northeastern part of the county, but it has since been overshadowed by San Isidro.

Geography
Delmita is located at  (26.685150, -98.423067).

Education
It is in the San Isidro Independent School District.

See also
 List of geographic names derived from anagrams and ananyms

References

External links
Profile of Delmita from the Handbook of Texas Online

Census-designated places in Starr County, Texas